Transitions is the twelfth studio album by American singer Freddie Jackson. It was released by Orpheus Music on September 26, 2006.

Critical reception

Allmusic editor Thom Jurek found that on Transitions "Jackson's sound is not significantly different, but then, when you have a voice like his, it doesn't have to be [...] Jackson reveals on this album the depth of yearning in the grain of his voice. It's full of dreams and possibilities, heartbreak and desire [...] This is a nice touch for an indie, and gives Jackson fans and newcomers plenty to sink their teeth into."

Track listing

Charts

References 

2006 albums
Freddie Jackson albums